Arshad Mahmood (born 1 November 1947) is a former field hockey player on the Pakistan Men's National Hockey Team. He won a bronze medal at the 1976 Summer Olympics in Montreal, Quebec, Canada.

References

External links
 

Pakistani male field hockey players
Olympic field hockey players of Pakistan
Olympic bronze medalists for Pakistan
Olympic medalists in field hockey
Medalists at the 1976 Summer Olympics
Field hockey players at the 1976 Summer Olympics
Asian Games medalists in field hockey
Field hockey players at the 1974 Asian Games
Asian Games gold medalists for Pakistan
Medalists at the 1974 Asian Games
Place of birth missing (living people)
1947 births
Living people
20th-century Pakistani people